Redler is a German surname. Notable people with the surname include:

 Arnold Redler (1875–1958), British founder of the conveying company Redler Limited in Stroud (Gloucestershire) in 1920
 Leon Redler, doctor of medicine, psychiatrist, psychotherapist, and teacher of the Alexander Technique
 Lucy Redler (born 1979), a German politician

See also
 Redler
 Rädler

German-language surnames